Worm is a 2006 Russian thriller drama film directed by Aleksei Muradov. It was entered into the 28th Moscow International Film Festival.

Cast
 Sergey Shnyryov as Sergei
 Anastasiya Sapozhnikova as Lyusya
 Vadim Demchog as Don Mook
 Dmitriy Persin
 Aleksandr Naumov as Sergei's father
 Galina Danilova as Sergei's mother
 Sofya Ledovskikh as Sergei's sister
 Anna Artemchuk as Lyusya as a child (as Anya Artemchuk)
 Mikhail Zayarin as Sergei as a child
 Tamara Spiricheva as Inga's grandmother
 Anastasia Yakovleva as girl with integrals
 Dana Agisheva as Jungia

References

External links
 

2006 films
2006 thriller drama films
Russian thriller drama films
2000s Russian-language films